Leigh Academies Trust is a multi-academy trust, formed of 31 schools based in the Kent, Medway and South East London areas.  Its Head Office is on the same site as Strood Academy, housing its Executive Team and central teams including Finance, Estates, Marketing, HR, Engagement and IT.

The trust has a number of subsidiaries such as LAT Apprenticeships, which runs a number of apprenticeship schemes and LAT Enterprises which generates income which is fed back into the trust's academies.

History 
Leigh Academies Trust was formed in 2008, linking the Leigh Academy and Longfield Academy, under a single governing body with Frank Green CBE as Chief Executive.  In November 2013 Simon Beamish was appointed as Chief Executive, replacing Green who was appointed National Schools Commissioner by the Department for Education.

Over the next ten years the trust grew steadily and in January 2019 merged with The Williamson Trust, absorbing five additional schools.

Schools 
Leigh Academies Trust oversees:

North Kent Cluster 

 Cherry Orchard Primary Academy
 Dartford Primary Academy
Hartley Primary Academy
Leigh Academy
The Leigh UTC
Longfield Academy
 Milestone Academy
 Wilmington Academy

Medway Cluster 

 Ebbsfleet Academy
 High Halstow Primary Academy
The Hundred of Hoo Academy
Leigh Academy Rainham
 Peninsula East Primary Academy
Sir Joseph Williamson's Mathematical School
Strood Academy

Central Kent Cluster 

 Bearsted Primary Academy
 Hayesbrook Academy
 Horsmonden Primary Academy
 Langley Park Primary Academy
 Marden Primary Academy
 Mascalls Academy
 Molehill Primary Academy
 Oaks Primary Academy
 Paddock Wood Primary Academy
 Snowfields Academy
 Tree Tops Primary Academy

South East London Cluster 

 Eastcote Primary Academy
The Halley Academy
Leigh Academy Blackheath
Stationers' Crown Woods Academy

Future 
As of June 2022 there no announced plans to open new academies or take on existing schools, however there are plans to convert High Weald Academy to an extension of Snowfields Academy from September 2022.

Also planned is the conversion of Hayesbrook Academy to a coeducational school, to include girls, from September 2023. The academy will then be rebranded Leigh Academy Tonbridge.

Executive team 
Simon Beamish, Chief Executive
Steve Avis, Chief Financial Officer
Stephane Vernoux, Chief Information Officer
Richard Taylor, People Director
Phil Whittall, Estates Director
Debbie Biggenden, Academies Director (Central Kent and Specialist Academies)
Tracey Trusler, Academies Director (North-West Kent and South-East London)
Emma Elwin, Academies Director (Medway and Ebbsfleet)

References

External links 
 

 
Multi-academy trusts